Tai'an is a county in the central part of Liaoning province, People's Republic of China.

Administrative divisions
There are 11 towns under the county's administration.
Tai'an
Gaolifang
Huangshatuo
Xinkaihe
Sanglin
Jiucaitai
Xintai
Fujia
Huandong
Xifo
Daniu

Climate

References

County-level divisions of Liaoning
Anshan